Álvaro Francisco Ampuero García-Rossell (born September 25, 1992) is a Peruvian footballer who plays for Universidad San Martín.

Ampuero has an outstanding advancing potency which combined with his precise shot make of him a constant threat on an attacking position. On August 25, 2012, he was signed by Parma to play for five seasons.

Club career

Universitario de Deportes
Ampuero made his official debut for Universitario de Deportes on 1 September 2011 in a Copa Sudamericana elimination match against Deportivo Anzoategui, at the age of 18. Starting at the left back position, his debut was a memorable one as he managed to score the first goal in the 2–1 away win for his club and was voted man of the match. This was also his first official goal, which was scored in the 30th minute by dribbling past his defender and shooting a strong left-footed shot into the bottom-right corner of the net. Ampuero made his Torneo Descentralizado debut on 17 September 2011, against Sport Boys away to the Estadio Miguel Grau. He started at left back and lasted the entire match, but it finished in a 2–0 loss for his side.
He made his Serie A debut for Parma on March 17 in the 2–0 loss against AS Roma.

Career statistics

Club 

¹ Includes Copa Libertadores and Copa Sudamericana.
² Includes Champions League and Europa League.

Honours

Club
Universitario de Deportes
U-20 Copa Libertadores (1): 2011

References

External links 

1992 births
Living people
Footballers from Lima
Peruvian footballers
Peruvian expatriate footballers
Peru international footballers
Club Universitario de Deportes footballers
Peruvian Primera División players
Parma Calcio 1913 players
Calcio Padova players
U.S. Salernitana 1919 players
Club Deportivo Universidad de San Martín de Porres players
Deportivo Municipal footballers
Zira FK players
Serie A players
Serie B players
Serie C players
Azerbaijan Premier League players
Peruvian expatriate sportspeople in Italy
Expatriate footballers in Italy
Expatriate footballers in Azerbaijan
Association football midfielders